Johanna Bundsen (born 3 June 1991) is a Swedish handball player for IK Sävehof and the Swedish national team.

Achievements  
Svensk handbollselit:
Winner: 2009, 2010, 2011, 2012, 2013, 2014, 2015, 2016
Swedish Handball Cup:
Winner: 2023
Carpathian Trophy:
Winner: 2015

References

External links

1991 births
Living people
Swedish female handball players
People from Uddevalla Municipality
Handball players at the 2016 Summer Olympics
Olympic handball players of Sweden
IK Sävehof players
Expatriate handball players
Swedish expatriate sportspeople in Denmark
Handball players at the 2020 Summer Olympics
Sportspeople from Västra Götaland County
21st-century Swedish women